Jan "Flash" Nilsson (born 15 December 1960) is a Swedish former active race car driver. He is most famous for his appearance in the Swedish Touring Car Championship, having driven full season in 15 seasons and for being the third most victorious driver (two championship wins and 35 race wins).

Early career 

Jan Nilsson started competing in Formula Ford in 1983 before moving on to Formula 3. He became the Swedish F3 champion in 1989 and drove Formula 3 in Japan and Mexico before moving to Clio Cup Scandinavia. He finished second in 1992 and moved up to Renault Spider Eurocup in 1993 after becoming champion in 1992. His first year in the Spider Eurocup saw him finishing in fourth place, as did the 1995 season. In 1996 he finished third.

STCC 

Jan Nilsson's own team, Flash Engineering, became the official Volvo team. He took the title in 1996 and 1997, both in a Volvo 850. and was second in 1998, this time in a Volvo S40. In 1999 he was 5th, and 6th in 2000. Nilsson finished second overall in the 2001, 2002 and 2003 seasons.

After a somewhat tough 2004 season (only one race win during the whole season) Jan Nilsson sold Flash Engineering. The team changed its name to Polestar Racing. Jan Nilsson started a new, smaller team for the 2005 season, also called Flash Engineering. The team ran one BMW 320i E46 for Jan Nilsson, finishing 9th overall in STCC 2005.

Flash Engineering signed on several new sponsors, the Swedish mailservice "Posten" among others, for 2006 and dramatically increased their available funds. They also signed on double Swedish champion Richard Göransson and former Flash Engineering Volvo driver Edward Sandström. Göransson and Nilsson drove new BMW 320si E90 cars for the 2006 season, while Sandström drove the older BMW 320i E46. Richard Göransson finished second in the championship while Nilsson was 9th again. Sandström was involved in a major accident early in the season in which the car was completely destroyed, and Sandström had to sit out the remaining races.

After a couple of struggling years in STCC, 2005 to 2007, Jan Nilsson was back winning races in 2008, 2009 and 2010. "Flash" competed with previous teammate Richard Göransson for the most overall victories in STCC. They both switched places several times between the 2008, 2009 and 2010 seasons, with Göransson finally taking the top spot with 34 versus 33 victories at the end of the 2010 season.

"Flash" finished 5th in the STCC 2007, 6th in 2008 and 2009, 9th in 2010 and 8th in 2011, his last full season in the championship.

Carrera Cup 

In 2005 Jan Nilsson took part in the Scandinavian Porsche Carrera Cup that runs as a support class to STCC, alongside his STCC programme in a BMW. This meant that Nilsson did four races each weekend, two in the BMW and two in the Porsche. Luckily for him both cars were rear wheel drive. Nilsson had more success in Carrera Cup and finished third overall. For 2006 he focused on STCC and his spot was filled by reigning champion Fredrik Ros in Carrera Cup.

References

External links
 Flash Engineering and Jan Nilsson's Homepage

1960 births
Living people
Swedish racing drivers
Swedish Touring Car Championship drivers
Swedish Formula Three Championship drivers
Japanese Formula 3 Championship drivers
Mexican Formula Three Championship drivers
European Touring Car Championship drivers
European Touring Car Cup drivers
Sportspeople from Karlstad
Porsche Carrera Cup Germany drivers